Aitor Arregi Arrieta (born 19 May 1990) is a Spanish footballer who plays as a centre-back for UD Logroñés.

Club career
Arregi was born in Bergara, Gipuzkoa, Basque Country. He played youth football with local club SD Eibar, making his senior debut in the 2009–10 season with the reserves in Tercera División.

In September 2011 Arregi was definitely promoted to the first team, signing a new two-year contract. In the 2012–13 campaign, he appeared in 25 matches (including the playoffs) and scored once as his team achieved promotion.

Arregi made his Segunda División debut on 31 August 2013, starting in a 1–1 away draw against UD Las Palmas. On 1 August of the following year, after featuring rarely as his side achieved another promotion, he was loaned to Cádiz CF in the third level.

Arregi terminated his contract with the Armeros on 2 July 2015, and subsequently signed for La Roda CF in the third division. He continued to appear in the category in the following years, representing SD Leioa, CD El Ejido, Racing de Ferrol and SD Amorebieta; with the latter, he was a regular starter in their first-ever promotion to the second division in 2021.

On 27 January 2022, Arregi terminated his contract with the Azules, and signed for Primera División RFEF side UD Logroñés the following day.

References

External links

1990 births
Living people
People from Bergara
Sportspeople from Gipuzkoa
Spanish footballers
Footballers from the Basque Country (autonomous community)
Association football defenders
Segunda División players
Segunda División B players
Tercera División players
SD Eibar footballers
Cádiz CF players
La Roda CF players
SD Leioa players
CD El Ejido players
Racing de Ferrol footballers
SD Amorebieta footballers
UD Logroñés players